The  and  are limited express train services in Japan operated jointly by the East Japan Railway Company (JR East) and Tobu Railway between  in Tokyo and  in Tochigi Prefecture.

Station stops
Nikkō and Spacia Nikkō services stop at the following stations.

Rolling stock
Since 4 June 2011, services are formed of refurbished 253-1000 series 6-car EMU sets. Tobu 100 series Spacia EMUs may also be substituted on these services, in which case they are named Spacia Nikkō. Prior to 4 June 2011, JR East services were formed of a dedicated 6-car 485 series EMU set, which was occasionally substituted by a reserve 189 series set nicknamed .

Past
 KiHa 44800 DMUs (October 1956–September 1959)
 157 series EMUs (September 1959–March 1963)
 165 series EMUs (March 1963–October 1982)
 485 series/189 series EMUs (March 2006–June 2011)

History

Semi-express Nikkō
Following electrification of the line, new 157 series EMUs were introduced from 22 September 1959. These ran as 6-car sets, lengthened to 8 cars during busy seasons. The 157 series sets were subsequently modified with the addition of air-conditioning, and transferred to Tokaido Main Line duties.

Semi-express Shōnan Nikkō
These were formed of 6-car 157 series sets based at Tamachi Depot in Tokyo. The 157 series EMUs on these services were replaced by 165 series from 25 March 1963. From the October 1968 timetable revision, the services were cut back to a single Nikkō to Itō working, and from 1 October 1970, this service was discontinued, replaced by the Izu 56 working from Tokyo to Itō.
 2502T Shōnan Nikkō Itō 07:46 → Nikkō 11:59
 2501T Shōnan Nikkō Nikkō 13:45 → Itō 17:50

The trains were formed as shown below.

Express Nikkō
From 25 March 1963, the service was upgraded to "Express" status with the introduction of new 165 series EMUs, running as 7-car formations with the inclusion of a "SaRo" Green (first class) car. This service operated until 14 October 1982, made redundant by the opening of the Tohoku Shinkansen.

Limited express Nikkō

From the start of the revised timetable on 16 March 2013, Nikkō services also stop at Urawa Station.

See also
 Kinugawa - a similar service between Shinjuku and Kinugawa-Onsen, also jointly operated by JR East and Tobu

References

External links
 JR East 485 series Nikkō/Kinugawa 

Named passenger trains of Japan
East Japan Railway Company
Tobu Railway
Railway services introduced in 1956
Railway services introduced in 2006
1956 establishments in Japan
2006 establishments in Japan